W. 'Gene' E. Alday, Jr. (August 17, 1957 – October 9, 2016) was an American Republican politician. He was a member of the Mississippi House of Representatives from the 25th District, being first elected in 2011, leaving office in 2016 after being defeated in the Republican primary by Dan Eubanks.

Alday has also been mayor of Walls, Mississippi.

In February 2015, Alday stated that he opposed increasing funding for education, because in his town, "all the blacks are getting food stamps and what I call 'welfare crazy checks'."

Alday died at the DeSoto South Hospice in Southaven after an extended illness on October 9, 2016.

References

1957 births
2016 deaths
People from Tunica, Mississippi
Republican Party members of the Mississippi House of Representatives
People from Walls, Mississippi
Mayors of places in Mississippi